FC Åland is a football club from Sund, Åland. The club was formed in 1992 after the merger of IFFK and Sunds IF (SIF). The team reached its present form in 2012, when Hammarlands IK and IF Fram merged their men's first teams with SIFFK. At the same time the team changed its name to FC Åland. The men's football first team currently plays in the Kakkonen (the third-highest level of football in Finland).

External links
Official Website

Football clubs in Finland
Football in Åland
Association football clubs established in 1992
1992 establishments in Finland